Sultanpur is a village in South district of Delhi, It's located near Mehrauli (one of the oldest city's of delhi) and Chhatarpur which is famous for Chhatarpur Temple and DLF Chhatarpur Farms, 
"Aa Ab Laut Chale" Directed by Rishi Kapoor film was also shot at this place (Chaupal)
According to the 2011 census , there are 3280 house's here, There are two (2) Government school's and three(3) National banks, The metro station (Sultanpur metro station) is 0.6 km away from the village.sultanpur is the village of YADAV’s

Demographics
 India census, Sultan Pur had a population of 15,160. Males constitute 57% of the population and females 43%. Sultan Pur has an average literacy rate of 69%, higher than the national average of 59.5%: male literacy is 75%, and female literacy is 61%. In Sultan Pur, 15% of the population is under 6 years of age.

References

Census Commission of India. Archived from the original on 2010-11

Cities and towns in South Delhi district